Gordon Peter Getty (born December 20, 1933) is an American businessman and classical music composer, the fourth child of oil tycoon J. Paul Getty. His mother, Ann Rork, was his father's fourth wife. When his father died in 1976, Gordon assumed control of Getty's US$2 billion trust. His net worth was $2.1 billion in September 2020, making him number 391 on the Forbes 400 list of the wealthiest Americans.

Early life
Getty was raised in San Francisco, California, where he attended St. Ignatius College Preparatory and the University of San Francisco. He would also earn a B.A. in music from the San Francisco Conservatory of Music.

Career
He joined the oil business to please his father; however, he eventually sold the family's Getty Oil to Texaco in 1986 for US$10 billion. In 1983, Forbes magazine ranked him the richest person in America with a net worth of a little over $2 billion. His net worth was cited as $2.1 billion in 2020, making him the 391st richest person in the United States.

In 2002, Getty founded ReFlow, a company which temporarily purchases shares in mutual funds to save funds taxes and commissions.

Classical music
Among several professions, Getty is a classical music composer whose compositions include the opera Plump Jack, Joan and the Bells, piano pieces, and a collection of choral works. His one-act opera Usher House was performed by the San Francisco Opera in 2015.  Aspiring to become an opera singer, Getty studied in the mid-1970s with Louise Caselotti, a mezzo-soprano who had been Maria Callas' voice teacher (1946–47). He and his wife have supported the fine arts, especially underwriting productions of the San Francisco Opera and the Russian National Orchestra.

Getty's opera The Canterville Ghost was premiered on May 9, 2015, at the Leipzig Opera.

Personal life
On Christmas Day, 1964, he married Ann Gilbert (1941–2020) in Las Vegas, Nevada.

Gordon and Ann Getty live in a grand yellow Italianate mansion in Pacific Heights, with sweeping views of the Golden Gate Bridge and Alcatraz. Over the years, he and Ann, a publisher and a decorator, expanded their living space, buying the house next door (to make room for his work at the piano) and then the house next door to that. They hosted charity events, opera stars, and fundraisers for politicians, including Kamala Harris and Gavin Newsom. (Newsom's father, William, one of Gordon's friends since high school, managed the family trust for years.)

On April 1, 2015, it was reported that Getty's son Andrew Rork Getty died at his home in Hollywood Hills, suffering, the Los Angeles County coroner's office found, from methamphetamine intoxication, heart disease, and bleeding linked to an ulcer. His $200 million share of the family trust was redistributed among his siblings.

Getty's assets are managed by Vallejo Investments. Vallejo Investments is a so-called "family office", an in-house financial team of specialized attorneys, accountants and money managers. It is estimated that there are some ten thousand such companies worldwide, controlling assets worth approximately six trillion dollars as of 2023.

Three of Getty's seven children were with Getty's then-mistress Cynthia Beck.
Two of Getty's daughters, Sarah and Kendalle, are suing a former financial advisor, Marlena Sonn, for "unjust enrichment." In a countersuit, Sonn accused the Gettys and their advisors of retaliating for her opposition to a "dubious tax avoidance scheme" that could save them as much as $300 million.

In popular culture
Gordon Getty's life as a composer was chronicled in Peter Rosen's documentary Gordon Getty: There Will be Music which premiered on February 5, 2016, at Cinema Village in New York City  and has been broadcast on PBS in the U.S. and Europe on ARTE, and also appeared in film festivals, and programs across the country.

Honors and awards 
 1986 – Outstanding American Composer, John F. Kennedy Center for the Performing Arts
 2003 – Gold Baton, League of American Orchestras
 2015 – University of San Francisco Alumnus of the Year

List of works 
Cantata and opera
 2015 - The Canterville Ghost
 2014 - Usher House
 Joan and the Bells
 Plump Jack

Chamber works
 Traditional Pieces

Choral works
 Annabel Lee
 Ballet Russe
 Beauty Come Dancing 
 La Belle Dame sans Merci
 For a Dead Lady
 The Little Match Girl
 The Old Man in the Night
 A Prayer for My Daughter
 There Was A Naughty Boy
 Those Who Love
 Three Christmas Carols
 Victorian Scenes
 Young America

Orchestral works
 Ancestor Suite
 Homework Suite
 Overture to Plump Jack
 Traditional Pieces

Piano works
 Ancestor Suite
 Andantino
 First Adventure
 Homework Suite
 Scherzo Pensieroso
 Traditional Pieces

Songs
 Four Dickinson Songs
 Hostess's Aria
 No My Good Lord
 Poor Peter
 A Prayer for My Daughter
 Where is My Lady
 The White Election

Discography 
Beauty Come Dancing (2018, PENTATONE PTC 5186621)
A Certain Slant of Light (2018, PENTATONE PTC 5186634)
The Canterville Ghost (2017, PENTATONE PTC 5186541)
 The Little Match Girl  (2015, PENTATONE PTC 5186480)
 December Celebration: New Carols by Seven American Composers (2015, PENTATONE PTC 5186537)
 Usher House (2013, PENTATONE PTC 5186451)
 Piano Pieces (2013, PENTATONE PTC 5186505)
 The Hours Begin to Sing (2013, PENTATONE PTC 5186459)
 Orchestral Works (2010, PENTATONE PTC 5186356)
 Plump Jack (2012, PENTATONE PTC 5186445)
 The White Election (2009, PENTATONE PTC 5186054)
 And if the song be worth a smile (2008, PENTATONE PTC 5186099)
 Young America Choral Works (2005, PENTATONE PTC 5186040)
 Joan and the bells & Serge Prokofiev – Romeo and Juliet  (2003, PENTATONE PTC 5186017)

References

External links
Forbes.com: Forbes World's Richest People
Gordon Getty composer website

1933 births
Living people
American billionaires
American businesspeople in the oil industry
American male classical composers
American classical composers
American financiers
American investors
American political fundraisers
American philanthropists
Businesspeople from Los Angeles
Businesspeople from San Francisco
Gordon
Musicians from Los Angeles
Composers from San Francisco
San Francisco Conservatory of Music alumni
California Democrats
20th-century American businesspeople
20th-century classical composers
21st-century American composers
21st-century American businesspeople
21st-century classical composers
20th-century American composers